The fifth season of Australian reality television series House Rules began airing on 30 April 2017. The series is produced by the team who created the Seven reality show My Kitchen Rules and is hosted by Johanna Griggs.

Applications for the fifth season of House Rules were open between 1 June and 30 July 2016 on the House Rules official network seven website. Johanna Griggs announced the series is in pre-production and that she is returning as host for season 5. Season 5 was officially confirmed in October 2016.

This season of House Rules will consist of new teams renovating each other's homes and further challenges for the ultimate prize of $200,000.

Format Changes
New Judges - This season will introduce two new judges, international design stylist, Laurence Llewelyn-Bowen and award-winning Australian architect and builder, Drew Heath, who will both be joining Wendy Moore. Judge of previous seasons, Joe Snell, will not be returning.

Ultimate Prize - The winners of this season will receive the ultimate prize of $200,000, as opposed to all previous seasons where the winners had received a full mortgage payment.

Bonus Room - During the Interior Renovations, one team is given the Bonus Room, which has its own rule but has to be finished in the same duration as the renovation. The team has the decision to keep it or give it to another team. The room is a "pass" or "fail" room only judged by the homeowners, meaning if they like it, the team receives 5 bonus points to their total score, but if they do not, they lose 5 points from the total score.

Grand Final - This will be the first season to not have a Live Grand Final, meaning the team with the highest score from the judges will win unlike previous seasons where the winners are decided by a combination of the judges score and the viewers vote.

Contestant Teams

This season of House Rules introduced six new teams. All teams are from different states in Australia.

Elimination history

Competition details

Phase 1: Interior Renovation
The six teams travel around the country to completely renovate each other's home. Every week, one team hands over their house to their opponents for a complete interior transformation. A set of rules from the owners are given to the teams known as the 'House rules' which need to be followed to gain high scores from the judges and the homeowner team.

Victoria: Fiona & Nicole
 Episodes 1 to 3
 Airdate — 30 April to 2 May
 Description — Teams head to their first renovation in Lake Fyans, Victoria, the hometown of Fiona & Nicole, to renovate Fiona's house. Two of the bedrooms belong to Fiona's children; Keanan, 11 years old and Bannon, 14 years old. For the first time in House Rules history, the original house will be knocked down and a new house will be completely rebuilt from the ground up.

Notes
* Andrew & Jono received the bonus room and decided to keep it. The bonus room was an Outdoor Entertainment Room. Fiona & Nicole judged it as a fail and the boys lost 5 points, meaning their score of 21 dropped to 16 taking them from 3rd place to bottom place.

South Australia: Kate & Harry
 Episodes 4 to 7
 Airdate — 3 to 8 May
 Description — Teams head to Kate & Harry's home in Adelaide, South Australia for the second renovation. One of the bedrooms belong to their 2 year old son, Xavier
Previous winner's advantage: Aaron & Daniella — Allocating the zones for themselves and all other teams.
Previous loser's disadvantage: Andrew & Jono — Camping in a tent during the renovation.

Notes
* Aaron & Daniella received the bonus room and decided to keep it. The bonus room was a Playroom for boys of all ages. Kate & Harry judged it as a fail and the couple lost 5 points, meaning their score of 21 dropped to 16 taking them from 4th place to bottom place.

Western Australia: Andrew & Jono
 Episodes 8 to 11
 Airdate — 9 to 15 May
 Description — Teams head to Andrew & Jono's home in Mandurah, Western Australia for the third renovation. 
Previous winner's advantage: Sean & Ella — Allocating the zones for themselves and all other teams.
Previous loser's disadvantage: Aaron & Daniella — Camping in a tent during the renovation.

Notes
* Sean & Ella received the bonus room but decided not to keep it and gave it to Fiona & Nicole. The bonus room was a Hidden Study. Andrew & Jono judged it as a pass and the team received 5 bonus points, meaning their score of 18 rose to 23 taking them from bottom place to 4th place.

New South Wales: Troy & Bec
 Episodes 12 to 15
 Airdate — 16 to 22 May
 Description — Teams head to Troy & Bec's home in Heckenberg, New South Wales for the fourth renovation. Two of the bedrooms belong to Bec's children; Hayley, 14 years old & Josh, 11 years old
Previous winner's advantage: Kate & Harry — Allocating the zones for themselves and all other teams.
Previous loser's disadvantage: Fiona & Nicole — Although Troy & Bec were the lowest scoring team in the previous week, they do not participate in the renovation of their own home, therefore the loser's tent was given to the second-lowest scorer.

Notes
* Kate & Harry received the bonus room and decided to keep it. The bonus room was Hayley's Bedroom. Troy & Bec judged it as a fail and the team lost 5 points, meaning their score of 21 dropped to 16 taking them from 4th place to bottom place.

Tasmania: Sean & Ella
 Episodes 16 to 19
 Airdate — 23 to 29 May
 Description — Teams head to Sean & Ella's home in Hobart, Tasmania for the fifth renovation. 
Previous winner's advantage: Aaron & Daniella — Allocating the zones for themselves and all other teams.
Previous loser's disadvantage: Kate & Harry — Camping in a tent during the renovation.

Notes
* Aaron & Daniella received the bonus room but decided not to keep it and gave it to Troy & Bec. The bonus room was the Guest Bedroom. Sean & Ella judged it as a fail and the team lost 5 points, meaning their score of 25 dropped to 20 taking them from equal bottom place (with Fiona & Nicole) to bottom place.

Queensland: Aaron & Daniella
 Episodes 20 to 23
 Airdate — 30 May to 5 June
 Description — Teams head to Aaron & Daniella's home in Gold Coast, Queensland for the sixth and final interior renovation. Two of the bedrooms belong to their children; Jaxon, 3 years old & Brooklyn, 8 months old. The lowest scoring team overall will be eliminated
Previous winner's advantage: Kate & Harry — Allocating the zones for themselves and all other teams.
Previous loser's disadvantage: Troy & Bec — Camping in a tent during the renovation.

Notes
* Kate & Harry received the bonus room but decided not to keep it and gave it to Troy & Bec. The bonus room was a Gym. Aaron & Daniella judged it as a pass and the team gained bonus 5 points, meaning their score of 20 rose to 25 taking them from 5th place to 4th place, but their overall score had them eliminated.

Phase 2

24 Hour Fix-Up

 Episode 24 & 25
 Airdate — 6 & 11 June 
 Description — All teams head back to their own homes and must fix and redo one of the zones in 24 hours. Teams need to recreate the space/s to reflect their own style and also to impress the judges. All teams received the same set of five rules for the challenge. The lowest scoring team will be eliminated.

Phase 3: Gardens & Exteriors

The top four teams are challenged to transform the exteriors and gardens of each other's homes. Two teams are allocated to a home (that do not belong to them) and must renovate either the front or back yards, as well as improving the house exterior. They are held over two rounds, covering all houses of the current teams. After both rounds are complete, the lowest scoring team is eliminated.

Round 1

 Episodes 26 & 28
 Airdate —  12 & 18 June
 Description — In round 1 of the exterior renovations, the 4 remaining teams head to the Gold Coast and Hobart to transform the gardens and house exterior in 4 Days. Teams are allocated to the front or back yard of either Aaron & Daniella's or Sean & Ella's

Notes
* During the renovation at Aaron & Daniella's House, the clock was stopped and the teams and crew had to leave the house due to the weather conditions caused by Cyclone Debbie.

Round 2

 Episodes 29 & 30
 Airdate —  19 & 25 June
 Description — In round 2 of the exterior renovations, the 4 remaining teams head to Mandurah and Adelaide to transform the gardens and house exterior in 4 Days. Teams are allocated to the front or back yard of either Andrew & Jono's or Kate & Harry's house. The lowest scoring team overall is eliminated.

Phase 4

Charity Unit Makeover

 Episodes 31 to 34
 Airdate — 26 June to 4 July
 Description — The 3 remaining teams have 7 days to renovate 3 units in The Bezzina House in St George, Sydney where cancer patients stay during treatment. The teams are given a unit each and they must follow the rules that are, for the first time, given by the judges', each team are only given one judges' rules to follow. Each team must also renovate a zone in the Common Area. The lowest-scoring team will be eliminated & the top 2 will advance into the live Grand Final.
Previous winner's advantage: Kate & Harry — Allocating a judges' rules to each of the teams and themselves

Notes
* Each team had to submit a statement piece to be judged, the winners were Kate & Harry who received 1 bonus point which will go towards their total score

Grand Final

 Episode 35
 Airdate — 9 July 
 Description — The final 2 teams complete one final challenge at their opponent's home. This will be the first season to not have a live Grand Final and the winners of will only be decided by the judges' scores. The team that receives the highest score will win the season and receive $200,000.

Ratings
 Colour key:
  – Highest rating during the season
  – Lowest rating during the season

Ratings data used is from OzTAM and represents the live and same day average viewership from the five largest Australian metropolitan centres (Sydney, Melbourne, Brisbane, Perth and Adelaide).

Notes
Melbourne, Adelaide & Perth only
Sydney & Brisbane only

References

2017 Australian television seasons